Ontotext GraphDB (previously known as BigOWLIM) is a graph database and knowledge discovery tool compliant with RDF and SPARQL and available as a high-availability cluster. Ontotext GraphDB is used in various European research projects.

As of April 2021, Graph DB is ranked as the 4th most -popular RDF store and 6th most-popular Graph DBMS system. Some categorize it as a NoSQL database. In 2014 Ontotext acquired the trademark "GraphDB" from Sones.

As for a typical graph DB, ontologies are an important input for the databases. The underlying idea is a semantic repository.

Architecture
GraphDB is used to store and manage semantic Knowledge Graph data.
It is built on top of the RDF4J architecture implemented through RDF4J's Storage and Inference Layer (SAIL). The architecture is made of three main components:

 The Workbench is a web-based administration tool. The user interface is based on RDF4J Workbench Web Application
 The Engine consists of a query optimizer, reasoner, storage and plugin manager. The reasoner in GraphDB is Forward chaining with the goal of total materialization. The plugin manager supports user-defined indexes and can be configured dynamically during run-time. These include:
 RDF Rank, which is an algorithm that identifies the most relevant entities, similar to Google's PageRank by evaluating their interconnectedness
 GeoSPARQL, which is the standard for geographical linked data. The plugin is able to convert between coordinate reference systems into the default, which OGC specifies as CRS84 format
 Lucene, which supports full-text search capabilities. This provides a variety of indexing options and the ability to simultaneously use multiple, differently configured indexes in the same query using Apache Lucene, a high-performance, full-featured text search engine
 The Connectors: The performance of search such as full-text search and faceted search can be vastly improved via the connectors by enabling the implementation by an external component or service. GraphDB has a connector for both well-known open-source search engines, Solr and Elasticsearch.
 There is also a connector enabling MongoDB integration, providing the scalability and performance advantages.
 Relational data virtualization (Ontology-Based Data Access, OBDA) is provided by integration of ontop
 SQL Access over JDBC is provided for traditional analytics tools such as Tableau and PowerBI
 Kafka Sink Connector for ingesting large amounts of data.
 GraphQL access to knowledge graphs and semantic search based on Elasticsearch and exposed through GraphQL.

Features and Integrations 
According to Ontotext, Graph DB supports:

 GraphDB uses RDF4J as a library, utilizing its APIs for storage and querying.
 It supports the GraphQL, SPARQL and SeRQL languages and RDF (e.g., RDF/XML, N3, Turtle) serialization formats.
 It supports custom reasoning rulesets, as well as RDFS, RDFS-plus, OWL 2 RL and QL.
 It integrates OpenRefine for the ingestion of tabular data and provides semantic similarity search at the document level.

Uses 
Ontotext Graph DB is used in various scientific areas, e.g., Genetics, Healthcare, Data Forensics, Cultural Heritage, Geography, Infrastructure Planning, Civil Engineering, Digital Historiography, Oceanography.

For more examples see "Diverse Uses of a Semantic Graph Database for Knowledge Organization and Research" below.

Commercial clients include BBC Sport, Financial Times, Springer Nature, UK Parliament, AstraZeneca as well as in the pharmaceutical and finance industries.

Some use cases focus on scalability and large data sizes.

See also 
 Graph databases
 Graph theory
 RDF database
 Glossary of graph theory

External links 
 Ontotext's Product Website
 Github repository for Apache Licensed Workbench for GraphDB
 Register Article from 15 Jan 2020 about Ontotext GraphDB
 W3.org entry for GraphDB
 Diverse Uses of a Semantic Graph Database for Knowledge Organization and Research: presentation, video, GitHub project and Zotero bibliography.

References 

Graph databases
Big data products
Database engines
Metadata
NoSQL
Online databases
Semantic Web
Structured storage
Triplestores